Dzianis is a given name. Notable people with the given name include:

Dzianis Hancharonak (born 1988), Belarusian kickboxer
Dzianis Harazha (born 1987), Belarusian sprint canoer
Dzianis Krytski (born 1988), Belarusian handball player
Dzianis Liseichykau (born 1979), Belarusian historian and archivist
Dzianis Makhlai (born 1990), Belarusian sprint canoeist
Dzianis Mihal (born 1985), Belarusian rower
Dzianis Rutenka (born 1986), Belarusian handball player 
Dzianis Simanovich (born 1987), Belarusian racewalker
Dzianis Zhyhadia, Belarusian sprint canoer 
Dzianis Zuev (born 1988), Belarusian kickboxer